Live Phish 04.02.98 is the first night of the four-night "Island Tour," recorded live at the Nassau Coliseum in Uniondale, New York, on April 2, 1998.

The short mini-run quickly became one of the most popular Phish performances of all time, with the band mixing the funk of 1997 with the high-energy jams of the mid-1990s along with brand new compositions.

Highlights include a 20-minute "Stash", an 18-minute "Twist", "Wolfman's Brother" -> "Sneakin' Sally Through the Alley", and the debut of "Frankie Says" and "Birds of a Feather".

In addition to being a CD release, this concert is available as a download in FLAC and MP3 formats at LivePhish.com.

Track listing

Disc one

Set one:
 "Tube" (Anastasio, Fishman) - 8:27
 "My Mind's Got a Mind of Its Own" (Hancock) - 2:36
 "The Sloth" (Anastasio) - 3:56
 "NICU" (Anastasio, Marshall) - 6:21
 "Stash" (Anastasio, Marshall) - 19:27 →
 "Horn" (Anastasio, Marshall) - 3:50 →
 "Waste" (Anastasio, Marshall) - 5:28 →
 "Chalk Dust Torture" (Anastasio, Marshall) - 11:15

Disc two

Set two:
 "Punch You in the Eye" (Anastasio) - 10:25 →
 "Simple" (Gordon) - 10:11 →
 "Birds of a Feather" (Anastasio, Fishman, Gordon, Marshall, McConnell) - 9:59

Disc three

Set two, continued:
 "Wolfman's Brother" (Anastasio, Fishman, Gordon, Marshall, McConnell) - 9:28 →
 "Sneakin' Sally Thru the Alley" (Toussaint) - 12:39 →
 "Frankie Says" (Anastasio, Fishman, Gordon, Marshall, McConnell) - 5:18 →
 "Twist" (Anastasio, Marshall) - 18:34 →
 "Sleeping Monkey" (Anastasio, Marshall) - 6:04 →
 "Rocky Top" (Bryant, Bryant) - 3:35
Encore:
 "Guyute" (Anastasio, Marshall) - 10:52

Personnel

Trey Anastasio - guitars, lead vocals
Page McConnell - piano, organ, backing vocals, lead vocals on "Frankie Says"
Mike Gordon - bass, backing vocals, lead vocals on "My Mind's Got a Mind of Its Own" and "Rocky Top"
Jon Fishman - drums, backing vocals

References

24
1998.04.02
2005 live albums
Elektra Records live albums